As an abbreviation, AMU may refer to:
 Academy of Performing Arts in Prague, Prague, Czech republic
 Acute medical unit, a short-stay department of some hospitals
 Adam Mickiewicz University, Poznań, Poland
 African and Malagasy Union
 Agency for the Modernisation of Ukraine
 African Mathematical Union
 Aix-Marseille University, Aix-en-Provence/Marseille, France 
 Aligarh Muslim University, Aligarh, India
 American Military University, Charles Town, West Virginia
 Antarctic Micronational Union
 Arab Maghreb Union
 Atomic mass unit, used to express atomic and molecular masses.
 Ave Maria University, Florida, USA
 Auxiliary Memory Units
 Asian Monetary Unit
 Northern Rhodesian African Mineworkers' Union, a former Northern Rhodesian trade union
 United States Army Marksmanship Unit
 United States Army Medical Unit

Amu may refer to:

 Amu (film), Indian film starring Konkona Sen Sharma
 Amu Hinamori, a fictional character from the manga series Shugo Chara! by Peach-Pit
 Amu Darya, a river in central Asia
 Amu (pharaoh)